The 2007 USL Premier Development League season was the 13th season of the PDL. The season started on April 28, 2007. The regular season ended on July 25, 2007.

Laredo Heat finished the season as national champions, beating the Michigan Bucks on penalty kicks after a 0–0 tie in the PDL Championship game in Laredo, Texas on August 11, 2007.

Hampton Roads Piranhas finished with the best regular season record in the league, winning 14 out of their 16 games, suffering no losses, and finishing with a +36 goal difference.

Fresno Fuego striker Pablo Campos was the league's top scorer, knocking in 18 goals. Thunder Bay Chill's Gustavo Oliveira led the league with 15 assists, while Hampton Roads Piranhas keeper Evan Newton enjoyed the best goalkeeping statistics, with a goals-against average of 0.222 per game, and keeping 8 clean sheets in his 14 games.

Changes from 2006

Name changes 
The Williamsburg Legacy changed their name to the Virginia Legacy and unveiled a new logo on January 31, 2007.
The Raleigh Elite changed their name to the Cary RailHawks U23's after forming a partnership with their USL First Division parent club Carolina RailHawks FC and unveiled a new logo on March 6, 2007.
Tacoma FC changed their name to Tacoma Tide on March 8, 2007.
The Virginia Beach Submariners were acquired by and renamed as the Hampton Roads Piranhas on April 6, 2007, after their parent club, the Virginia Beach Mariners, was terminated on March 30.
The Boulder Rapids Reserve changed their name to the Colorado Rapids U23's on April 12, 2007, as well as their logo and colors, to reflect the changes undertaken by their parent club, the Colorado Rapids.

New franchises
Ten teams joined the league this year, including seven brand new franchises:

Folding
Six teams left the league prior to the beginning of the season:
Ajax Orlando Prospects - Orlando, Florida
Augusta Fireball - Augusta, Georgia
California Gold - Modesto, California
Colorado Springs Blizzard - Colorado Springs, Colorado
Kalamazoo Kingdom - Kalamazoo, Michigan
San Diego Gauchos - San Diego, California

Playoff format
The top two teams in each division advance to the playoffs, with all playoff matchups consisting of one game.  Each conference will hold separate playoffs at a host location.  The format for each conference playoff consists of one division winner playing against the other division's second-place club, with winners advancing to the conference final.  The winners of each conference play in the national semifinal, determined as such: Central vs Western, Eastern vs Southern.  The winners of these matches play in the final match scheduled on August 11.

Current standings

Central Conference

Great Lakes Division

Heartland Division

Eastern Conference

Mid Atlantic Division

Northeast Division

Southern Conference

Mid South Division

Southeast Division

Western Conference

Northwest Division

Southwest Division

Playoffs

Playoff bracket

Conference semifinals

Conference finals

National Semifinals

National final

See also
United Soccer Leagues 2007

USL League Two seasons
4